Avant Hard is the third studio album by English electronic music band Add N to (X). It was released in 1999 on Mute Records.

The track "Metal Fingers in My Body" was used in an advertisement for a digital television service in the UK, played as the background music for skateboarder Danny Way for a montage of tricks. "Barry 7's Contraption" was used as the background music for a telecoms advert for Orange UK directed by Chris Cunningham, and was used regularly as backing music on the TV series Banzai.

Track listing

Sample credits
"Machine Is Bored with Love" is based on samples from "Fugue in D Minor", written and performed by Egg (Dave Stewart, Dirk Campbell and Clive Brooks).

Personnel

Production
Add N to (X) – production, arrangement
Barry 7 – production, arrangement
Dean Honer – production, arrangement
Ebby Acquah – engineering
Steve D'Agostino – engineering
Roger Johnson – engineering

Additional musicians
Rob Allum
Alison Goldfrapp

Artwork and design
Add N to (X) – artwork
Joe Dilworth – band photos

Charts

References

Add N to (X) albums
1999 albums
Mute Records albums